In 1989, Canon released a single lens reflex camera,  the EOS-1. It utilized new technologies not found in the earlier EOS-650, in a professional level body, of which, many of its unique, distinctive characteristics are still found today in more recent versions of its series. Numerous accessories were also available to boost performance and battery life.

Canon EOS-1N 

In November 1994, Canon released the EOS-1N. It is a 35mm focal-plane shutter single lens reflex camera. This model introduced a new autofocus configuration with five focusing points. Each can detect contrast both vertically and horizontally either automatically or manually rather than one point that was provided by the Canon EOS-1. The camera model is said to be more durable than the last. The model pairs well with telephoto lenses that are favourite by professional photographers due to its silent and fast photo taking action - with a lifespan of 100,000 shutter lifecycles. A series of later model followed in its footsteps.

Canon EOS-1V 

Six years later, Canon came out with another update, called the EOS-1V, which took upon a new design and enhanced the already revolutionary features of previous EOS-1 series cameras. It had an incredible 45 point autofocus, new AF-assist points that could detect movement of subjects throughout the frame, and automatically change between AF points. The EOS 1V was the first 1 series camera to use the E-TTL flash metering system. This product is no longer available on the Canon website but can be found on secondary markets.

Canon EOS-1D & EOS-1Ds 

Following the 1V, in 2001 Canon came out with a completely new camera called the EOS-1D, it had the same body, and nearly all the same features as the 1V, but what was new was a 4.1 million pixels APS-H sized CCD sensor, rather than a roll of film. It was also different in form, as it was canon's first professional camera,  which they made themselves. As the camera sensor was low in resolution and not 35 mm equivalent, it is ideal for wildlife and sports photography, but not for professionals- studio. Wedding & portrait photographers continued using film cameras. Canon combated this by releasing the EOS-1Ds. It had an 11 megapixel 35 mm equivalent CMOS sensor, offering a large amount of detail & high image quality. Additionally, these cameras are equipped with two autofocus modes and an additional ability of manual focusing.

Canon EOS-1D Mark II, EOS-1Ds Mark II & EOS-1D Mark II N 

While the 1Ds were a series of impressive and technically sound cameras, they lacked functions and features that specific market demand, especially for sports & wildlife photographers. However, the EOS-1D Mark II, on the other hand, brought new features that are targeted exclusively at professional sports, & wildlife photographers. It had much higher megapixels that translate to higher detailed photograph, wireless capability (with an external transmitter), and an additional card slot. All of these features made the camera much more versatile. Later Canon also released the EOS-1D Mark II N, which offered many crucial improvements. The first being a slightly larger screen, however, there was no increase in resolution. It also offered a marginally faster burst rate & an improved version of E-TTL flash metering system, known as E-TTL II.

Canon EOS-1D Mark III & EOS-1Ds Mark III 

In 2007, Canon redesigned their flagship DSLR. This new generation of camera had a whole variety of new features. Both the EOS-1D Mark III & EOS-1Ds Mark III offered a new, much larger & higher resolution LCD monitor, ethernet compatibility, amazing new autofocus & a new form, very similar to that of recent cameras of this series. While the new 1D had incredible burst shooting capabilities, the new 1Ds had an amazing new sensor. Besides all the improvements in these cameras, there was one new revolution Canon added that really made these cameras unique. The feature is Live view. Using Live view, users could see a live preview of the composition, exposure, focus and the image itself from the 3 inch LCD.

Canon EOS-1D Mark IV 

In 2009, Canon introduced the EOS-1D Mark IV. Contrary to its branding, the EOS-1D Mark IV is the successor of the Canon EOS-1D Mark III and was announced on 20 October 2009, just four days after Nikon announced the D3s. Some say the 1D Mark IV a slight improved model of the 1D Mark III, it had the same body, similar autofocus, and the same drive. However, there were a couple of added features in the Mark IV. One was that the 39 cross-type AF points were now all user-selectable. Another quirk was video capabilities, which had already been found on other Canon EOS cameras. The only substantial improvement was the improved ISO performance (100–12800 ISO speed equivalent). They never updated the 1Ds, due to Canon manufacturing another full frame camera.

Canon EOS-1DX & EOS-1DC 

In 2012, Canon took the action capturing capabilities of the 1D series, & the full-frame sensor of the 1Ds series into one incredible camera: the EOS-1DX. Unlike either of the previous camera, it offered incredible new revolutions. While the 1D mark IV was capable of high ISO's, it never performed well with noise. The new 1DX, on the other hand, featured amazingly little noise at high ISO. Canon also released the EOS-1DC. It was a cinema orientated camera that offered 4K video with a 10bit 4:2:2 colour space and Canon Log capabilities internally, but it never sold well due to its high price point & form factor that was simply not suited for video use.

Canon EOS-1DX Mark II 

In 2016, Canon decided to release an update to the 1DX that had slight improvements in many areas – the EOS-1DX Mark II. It was even better than the previous generation 1DX in low light, and had slightly better autofocus, but one of the more significant photography features was the new buffer. It meant you could take up to 170 RAW images in a row (when using 'CFast' 2.0 cards) & shoot fine JPEGs infinitely. It also had many consumer-orientated video features, such as Dual-pixel CMOS AF, and 4K60 DCI recording, but lacked cinema-based features, such as C-LOG, or 10bit 4:2:2 colour space.

Canon EOS-1DX Mark III 

In early 2020, a little time after the release of the 1DX Mark II, One of Canon's   competitors had released a camera with capabilities unseen in Canon's professional cameras. Canon combated this by releasing a totally new, much faster camera, which is currently rumored to possibly be the Finale of the EOS-1 line, as Canon are no longer developing lenses for its mount. This camera offered a totally new autofocus, HEIF image recording, 5.5K RAW video, incredible burst rate capabilities & a nearly unlimited buffer. Canon claims this is the fastest, most durable Canon shutter ability yet manufactured. They also claim to have made the most powerful video featured version to date in an EOS DSLR series.

References

Canon EOS cameras